The Honourable George Charles Brodrick (5 May 1831 – 8 November 1903) was an Oxford historian and author who became Warden of Merton College, Oxford.

Life
He was the son of William Brodrick, 7th Viscount Midleton and younger brother of William Brodrick, 8th Viscount Midleton. He was educated at Eton College and Balliol College, Oxford, where he attained a first class degree in classics (1853) and in law and history (1854). He was President of the Oxford Union during 1854–55. He gained his B.A, degree in 1854, and was M.A. in 1856, and D.C.L. in 1886.

Brodrick was elected to be a Fellow of Merton College in 1855 and was called to the bar in 1859. He joined the staff of The Times in 1860. He tried unsuccessfully to enter parliament as a Liberal and was opposed to William Gladstone's policy on Ireland. He was a member of the London School Board from 1877 to 1879 and Warden of Merton from 1881 until his death in 1903.

Books 
Brodrick wrote a number of books, including:

 English Land and English Landlords: An Enquiry into the Origin and Characters of the English Land System, with Proposals for its Reform (1881)
 Essays on Reform (1867)
 The History of England: From Addington's Administration to the Close of William IV's Reign, 1801–1837 (with John Knight Fotheringham)
 A History of the University of Oxford (1886)
 Literary Fragments
 Memorials of Merton College; With Biographical Notices of the Wardens and Fellows (1885)
 Memories and Impressions, 1831–1900 (1900)
 Political Studies (1879)
 The Reform of the English Land System

References

External links
 
 

1831 births
1903 deaths
People educated at Eton College
Alumni of Balliol College, Oxford
Fellows of Merton College, Oxford
Wardens of Merton College, Oxford
The Times people
19th-century English historians
English male journalists
Members of the London School Board
Younger sons of viscounts
Members of Lincoln's Inn
Presidents of the Oxford Union
19th-century English lawyers